Nitanju Bolade Casel has been a member of the African American a cappella ensemble Sweet Honey in the Rock since 1985. Prior to joining, Casel spent four years studying performance and cultural organization in Dakar, Senegal. While in Africa, she and MarieLouise Guinier co-founded ADEA (Artistes des Echanges Africaines), an organization that seeks to use the arts to facilitate the exchange of ideas and services between Pan African people.

Casel has contributed a number of original musical compositions and contemporary arrangements of traditional African songs to Sweet Honey in the Rocks repertoire. Her compositions are also included in a children's textbook, World of Music, and The Box, a pilot TV show from Robert De Niro's Tribeca Production Company.

Casel appeared in the 1998 film, Beloved, starring Oprah Winfrey and Danny Glover. She was also a guest artist in the Smithsonian Institution production of Duke Ellington's Great Ladies of Song.

Casel is a co-director of First World Productions, a cultural and educational performance arts organization.

References 

Living people
Year of birth missing (living people)
Sweet Honey in the Rock members
American women singers
African-American women singers
21st-century American women